Conrad Murphy (born 18 February 1982) is an Irish former Gaelic footballer who played for club side Clonakilty, at inter-county level with the Cork senior football team and for the national team. He usually lined out in the forwards.

Honours

Cork
Munster Senior Football Championship: 2002
All-Ireland Minor Football Championship: 2000
Munster Minor Football Championship: 2001

References

External links
 Conrad Murphy profile at the Hogan Stand website

1982 births
Living people
UCC Gaelic footballers
Clonakilty hurlers
Clonakilty Gaelic footballers
Cork inter-county Gaelic footballers
Munster inter-provincial Gaelic footballers
Irish international rules football players
Irish solicitors